The Thessaloniki International Fair (Diethnis Ekthesi Thessalonikis), abbreviated TIF (ΔΕΘ), is an annual international exhibition event held in Thessaloniki, Greece's second-largest city. It has been held in the first week of September since 1926, and its opening is traditionally marked by a series of programmatical statements by the Prime Minister of Greece. The 2020 fair was cancelled due to the COVID-19 pandemic, the first cancellation since WW2.

Description

The International Exhibition & Congress Centre of TIF HELEXPO is located in the YMC Square in downtown Thessaloniki, with easy access from any location in the city and using any means of transportation.

With trade fairs and consumer exhibitions held throughout the year at exhibition premises of European specifications, it is the most important exhibition organisation agency in Greece.
At the heart of the city's history, adjacent to the Byzantine Museum and the Archaeological Museum, the International Exhibition Centres of TIF HELEXPO attract a wealth of conference events.

The TIF HELEXPO Exhibition Centre covers a total area of 180,000 sq.m., of which 62,000 sq.m. are indoor exhibition areas, distributed into a complex of 17 pavilions that are functionally designed and interconnected to serve the needs of each event. The exhibition facilities are complemented by conference centres, parking areas, sports and recreational facilities, catering areas, citizen service centres, museums, banks and developmental agency offices. This way, Thessaloniki International Exhibition Centre functions as a hub providing services that successfully meet the requirements of exhibitions, conferences and cultural events.

Similar trade fairs of the city have occurred regularly since the Byzantine era, attracting traders from all over the Balkans.

Events
It has been customary for the country's prime minister to set out his government's policies for each coming year in a speech at the annual Thessaloniki International Trade Fair, and for this reason the event has political significance in addition to its commercial importance.

Gallery

References

External links 
HELEXPO 

Annual events in Thessaloniki
Trade fairs in Greece
Tourist attractions in Thessaloniki
Economy of Thessaloniki
Trade Fair
1926 establishments in Greece
Autumn events in Greece